Trust is a British television legal drama, produced, written and created by Simon Block, and broadcast on BBC One from 9 January until 13 February 2003. The series starred Robson Green, with Sarah Parish, Neil Stuke, Chiwetel Ejiofor, Eva Birthistle and Ian McShane. Only one series was made before the programme was decommissioned by the BBC. Trust received  mixed reviews in the British press, but received better critical acclaim when it was rebroadcast on BBC America in 2004. The series was produced by Box TV Productions.

Plot
Trust revolves around a corporate law team led by partner Stephen Bradley (Robson Green), a maverick lawyer who often finds sense in apparently senseless argument. In each episode, the team are presented with corporate clients who require the services of the law firm, often in the handling of critical deals including takeovers, mergers and acquisitions and dissolutions. The series also deals with issues relating to long city working hours, corporate competition, drug abuse in the work place and corporate social responsibility, or the lack of it.

The series is set in the City of London and makes full use of the city's iconic buildings as visual references. Cooper Fozard's offices are portrayed using two separate buildings for exterior shots — Thomas More Square in Wapping is portrayed as Cooper Fozard's office building, while roof shots, which often provide breaks within episode stories to focus on series spanning themes, are filmed at 1 Poultry. Other locations have included The Bank of England and St Paul's Cathedral. The series makes constant use of aerial photographs of the city, with Tower 42, The Gherkin (while still under construction), Shoreditch & Hoxton, Lloyd's of London and The Royal Exchange frequently being utilised to set the scene. The title sequence features shots of the City from Waterloo Bridge, and the title banner is displayed over an ultra-wide angle shot of the Aviva building and 122 Leadenhall Street in Undershaft.

Cast
 Robson Green as Stephen Bradley; a maverick partner and team leader of Cooper-Fozard
 Sarah Parish as Annie Naylor; lawyer, aspiring partner, and a member of Stephen's team
 Neil Stuke as Martin Greig; a talented, openly gay lawyer on Stephen's team
 Chiwetel Ejiofor as Ashley Carter; a talented junior lawyer who often works apart from the team
 Eva Birthistle as Maria Acklam; a trainee lawyer on Stephen's team
 Ian McShane as Alan Cooper-Fozard; the enigmatic senior partner, known more often as The PG
 Nick Sidi as Sammy Samuelson
 Rosie Day as Emma Naylor
 Dugald Bruce Lockhart as Dougie Baker
 Julie Saunders as Serene Green
 Sara Houghton as Melissa Chang

Episodes

External links

References

BBC television dramas
2000s British legal television series
2003 British television series debuts
2003 British television series endings
2000s British drama television series
2000s British television miniseries
English-language television shows
Television shows set in London